Adam Oneal Butler (born April 12, 1994) is an American football defensive end for the Las Vegas Raiders of the National Football League (NFL). He played college football at Vanderbilt.

Early years
Butler, a descendant of the children's rights campaigner Edna Gladney, attended Duncanville High School in Duncanville, Texas. He was a two-time captain of the Duncanville Panthers football team, earning MVP honors his senior season.

College career
Butler attended Vanderbilt University in Nashville, Tennessee. After redshirting his freshman year, Butler became a prominent member of the Vanderbilt Commodores defense. Butler played four seasons for Vanderbilt, accumulating 113 total tackles, 10 sacks, two blocked PATs, and one defensive touchdown.

Professional career

New England Patriots
Butler signed with the New England Patriots as an undrafted free agent on May 5, 2017. After impressing in the Patriots' training camp and preseason that summer, he earned a spot on the Patriots' 53-man roster. He was active for the Patriots' regular season home opener, seeing 21 snaps and recording a tackle in a 42–27 loss to the Kansas City Chiefs. The Patriots made it to Super Bowl LII, but came up short to the Philadelphia Eagles by a score of 41–33 with Butler recording 1 tackle. The Patriots made it back to the Super Bowl during the 2018 season where they defeated the Los Angeles Rams 13–3 in Super Bowl LIII.
In week 2 of the 2019 season against the Miami Dolphins, Butler recorded 2 sacks as the Patriots won 43–0.
In week 8 against the Cleveland Browns, Butler recorded a team high 2 sacks on Baker Mayfield in the 27–13 win.

Butler re-signed on a one-year restricted free agent contract with the Patriots on April 17, 2020.

Miami Dolphins
On March 18, 2021, Butler signed a two-year contract with the Miami Dolphins. On August 2, 2022, Butler was released because of a failed physical.

Las Vegas Raiders
On January 27, 2023, Butler signed a reserve/future contract with the Las Vegas Raiders.

References

External links

Vanderbilt Commodores bio
New England Patriots bio

1994 births
Living people
American football defensive tackles
Las Vegas Raiders players
Miami Dolphins players
New England Patriots players
People from Duncanville, Texas
Players of American football from Texas
Sportspeople from the Dallas–Fort Worth metroplex
Vanderbilt Commodores football players